Krasnogorovka is a rural locality (a selo) in Dyachenkovskoye Rural Settlement, Bogucharsky District, Voronezh Oblast, Russia. The population was 482 as of 2010. There are 15 streets.

Geography 
Krasnogorovka is located 25 km east of Boguchar (the district's administrative centre) by road. Tereshkovo is the nearest rural locality.

References 

Rural localities in Bogucharsky District